The Fine Arts Museums of San Francisco (FAMSF), comprising the de Young Museum in Golden Gate Park and the Legion of Honor in Lincoln Park, is the largest public arts institution in the city of San Francisco. The permanent collection of the Fine Arts Museums, with about 150,000 objects, is organized into nine areas, each with a curatorial staff.

History 

"The Fine Arts Museums of San Francisco are governed by three boards. The Fine Arts Museums (FAMSF) of San Francisco is a Charitable Trust Department of the City and County of San Francisco. The Museums’ endowment funds are held by The Fine Arts Museums Foundation (FAMF), a private 501(c)3 organization. The Corporation of the Fine Arts Museums (COFAM) is also a private 501(c)3 organization, which raises funds for and manages most of the day-to-day operations of the museums."

Unlike most other major art museums, the Fine Arts Museums of San Francisco do not have a large endowment from which to draw. The museums operate on an annual budget funded by membership dues, ticket sales, donations (from philanthropy and grants) and purchases in its stores. They are run in a private-public partnership with the city of San Francisco, which owns the two museum buildings and covers about 23 percent of their operating expenses by providing security guards and paying insurance premiums. In 2016, the two museums drew a combined 1,402,000 visitors. FAMSF operates on an annual budget of around $55 million dollars.

The de Young’s Artist Studio is an artist-in-residency program to encourage arts community engagement and support emerging artists and since 2010 is part of the Cultural Encounters initiative.

In 2012, the Fine Arts Museums of San Francisco and the Louvre museum signed an agreement that provides for collaborative exhibitions and the sharing of art works. The agreement has a duration of five years. It creates a partnership to promote short- and long-term loans art works that allow the works to be seen in both cities, joint publications, art conservation projects and educational programs.

Thomas P. Campbell became director of the Fine Arts Museums of San Francisco on November 1, 2018, replacing the role previously held by Max Hollein.

References

External links
 
 

 
Museums with year of establishment missing
Articles with WikiMiniAtlas displaying incorrectly; WMA not showing area